Meadowbrook station may refer to:

 Meadowbrook station (SEPTA), a regional rail station in Abington, Pennsylvania
 Meadowbrook station (UTA), a light rail station in South Salt Lake, Utah